Alan David Sokal (born January 24, 1955) is an American professor of mathematics at University College London and professor emeritus of physics at New York University. He works in statistical mechanics and combinatorics. He is a critic of postmodernism, and caused the Sokal affair in 1996 when his deliberately nonsensical paper was published by Duke University Press's Social Text. He also co-authored a paper criticizing the critical positivity ratio concept in positive psychology.

Academic career
Sokal received his BA from Harvard College in 1976 and his PhD from Princeton University in 1981. He was advised by Arthur Wightman. In the summers of 1986, 1987, and 1988, Sokal taught mathematics at the National Autonomous University of Nicaragua, when the Sandinistas were heading the elected government.

Research interests
Sokal's research lies in mathematical physics and combinatorics. In particular, he studies the interplay between these fields based on questions arising in statistical mechanics and quantum field theory. This includes work on  the chromatic polynomial and the Tutte polynomial, which appear both in algebraic graph theory and in the study of phase transitions in statistical mechanics. His interests include computational physics and algorithms, such as  Markov chain Monte Carlo algorithms for problems in statistical physics. He also co-authored a book on quantum triviality.

In 2013, Sokal co-authored a paper with Nicholas Brown and Harris Friedman, rejecting the Losada Line, a concept popular in positive psychology. Named after its proposer, Marcial Losada, it refers to a critical range for an individual's ratio of positive to negative emotions, outside of which the individual will tend to have poorer life and occupational outcomes. This concept of a critical positivity ratio was highly cited and popularised by psychologists such as Barbara Fredrickson. The trio's paper, published in American Psychologist, contended that the ratio was based on faulty mathematical reasoning and therefore invalid.

Sokal affair

In 1996, Sokal was curious to see whether the then-non-peer-reviewed postmodern cultural studies journal Social Text (published by Duke University Press) would publish a submission which "flattered the editors' ideological preconceptions". Sokal submitted a grand-sounding but completely nonsensical paper titled "Transgressing the Boundaries: Toward a Transformative Hermeneutics of Quantum Gravity."

After holding the article back from earlier issues because of Sokal's refusal to consider revisions, the staff published it in the "Science Wars" issue as a relevant contribution. Soon thereafter, Sokal then revealed that the article was a hoax in the journal Lingua Franca, arguing that the left and social science would be better served by intellectual underpinnings based on reason. The affair was front-page news in The New York Times on May 18, 1996. Sokal responded to leftist and postmodernist criticism of the deception by asserting that he was himself a leftist, and that his motivation was to "defend the Left from a trendy segment of itself".

The affair, together with Paul R. Gross and Norman Levitt's 1994 book Higher Superstition, can be considered to be a part of the so-called science wars.

Sokal followed up in 1997 by co-authoring the book Impostures Intellectuelles with physicist and philosopher of science Jean Bricmont  (published in English, a year later, as Fashionable Nonsense). The book accuses some social sciences academics of using scientific and mathematical terms incorrectly and criticizes proponents of the "strong program" of the sociology of science for denying the value of truth. The book had contrasted reviews, with some lauding the effort, and some more reserved.

In 2008, Sokal revisited the Sokal affair and its implications in Beyond the Hoax.

References

External links 

 Publications at the Academic Genealogy Wiki
 University College London
 "Transgressing the Boundaries: Towards a Transformative Hermeneutics of Quantum Gravity"
 Pseudoscience and Postmodernism: Antagonists or Fellow-Travelers? in: Archaeological Fantasies: How Pseudoarchaeology Misrepresents the Past and Misleads the Public, ed. Fagan (2004). 
 Alan Sokal’s collection of articles related to the Social Text Affair
 An interview with Alan Sokal on The Marketplace of Ideas

1955 births
Living people
21st-century American physicists
20th-century American Jews
Critics of postmodernism
20th-century American mathematicians
21st-century American mathematicians
Harvard College alumni
New York University faculty
Academics of University College London
Princeton University alumni
Academic staff of the National Autonomous University of Nicaragua
20th-century American physicists
Mathematicians from Massachusetts
Scientists from Boston
21st-century American Jews
Hoaxers